The Tour du Togo is a multi-day road cycling race annually held in Togo.

Winners (since 2002)

References

Cycle races in Togo
Recurring sporting events established in 1992
1992 establishments in Togo